Routledge Encyclopedia of Modernism is an online encyclopedia published by Routledge since 2016.

The encyclopedia has been reviewed by the Reference Reviews of Emerald Group Publishing. It has been called the "dada of encyclopedias" by The Times Literary Supplement.

References

External links
 Routledge Encyclopedia of Modernism

Specialized encyclopedias
British online encyclopedias
Publications established in 2016
Routledge books
21st-century encyclopedias